APG is an abbreviation with several different meanings:
 Aberdeen Proving Ground, a United States Army installation in Aberdeen, Maryland, also
Phillips Army Airfield, the airfield of the above, from its IATA airport code
 Aboriginal Provisional Government, Indigenous Australian independence movement
 Alkyl polyglycoside, a class of surfactants
 Ambulatory Patient Group 
 André-Pierre Gignac, a French footballer who plays for Liga MX club Tigres UANL and the France national team
 Android Privacy Guard, an implementation of Pretty Good Privacy for the Android operating system
 Angiosperm Phylogeny Group, a collaboration of botanists, publishing classification systems of flowering plants
 Annealed pyrolytic graphite, a thermally conductive form of synthetic graphite
 Anterior Pituitary Gland, an endocrine gland
 APG Airlines, a French airline based in Cannes.
APG, a Netherlands-based pension fund established under the Stichting Pensioenfonds ABP
 Arc Pair Grammar
 Artist Placement Group, an art group founded in 1966.
 Asia/Pacific Group on Money Laundering, the FATF-style regional body for the Asia and Pacific region
 Aspley Guise railway station, from its National Rail code
 Association of Professional Genealogists
 Associated petroleum gas
 Atlas of Peculiar Galaxies
 Austrian Power Grid, Austrian electric power transmission company
 Automated Password Generator, a software generating password
 Automatic platform gate, a safety facility preventing awaiting passenger falling from station platform to rail tracks
 Assists per game, in basketball
 ICAO airline designator of Philippines AirAsia